Pacific Haven is a rural locality in the Fraser Coast Region, Queensland, Australia.

Geography
The Burrum River forms the eastern and northern boundaries, while the Isis River forms part of the western.

References 

Fraser Coast Region
Localities in Queensland